The loonie, formally the Canadian one-dollar coin, is a gold-coloured Canadian coin that was introduced in 1987 and is produced by the Royal Canadian Mint at its facility in Winnipeg. The most prevalent versions of the coin show a common loon, a bird found throughout Canada, on the reverse and Queen Elizabeth II, the nation's head of state at the time of the coin's issue, on the obverse.  Various commemorative and specimen-set editions of the coin with special designs replacing the loon on the reverse have been minted over the years.

The coin's outline is an 11-sided Reuleaux polygon. Its diameter of 26.5 mm and its 11-sidedness matched that of the already-circulating Susan B. Anthony dollar in the United States, and its thickness of 1.95 mm was a close match to the latter's 2.0 mm. Its gold colour differed from the silver-coloured Anthony dollar; however, the succeeding Sacagawea and Presidential dollars matched the loonie's overall hue. Other coins using a non-circular curve of constant width include the 7-sided British twenty pence and fifty pence coins (the latter of which has similar size and value to the loonie, but is silver in colour).

After its introduction, the coin became a metonym for the Canadian dollar: media often discuss the rate at which the loonie is trading against other currencies. The nickname loonie became so widely recognized that in 2006, the Royal Canadian Mint secured the rights to it. When the Canadian two-dollar coin was introduced in 1996, it was in turn nicknamed the "toonie" (a portmanteau of "two" and "loonie").

Background
Canada first minted a silver dollar coin in 1935 to celebrate the 25th anniversary of George V's reign as king. The voyageur dollar, so named because it featured an Indigenous person and a French voyageur paddling a canoe on the reverse, was minted in silver until 1967, after which it was composed primarily of nickel.

By 1982, the Royal Canadian Mint had begun work on a new composition for the dollar coin that it hoped would lead to increased circulation. At the same time, vending machine operators and transit systems were lobbying the Government of Canada to replace the dollar banknotes with more widely circulating coins. A Commons committee recommended in 1985 that the dollar bill be eliminated despite a lack of evidence that Canadians would support the move. The government argued that it would save between $175 million and $250 million over 20 years by switching from bills that had a lifespan of less than a year to coins that would last two decades.

Introduction
The government announced on March 25, 1986, that the new dollar coin would be launched the following year as a replacement for the dollar bill, which would be phased out. It was expected to cost $31.8 million to produce the first 300 million coins, but through seigniorage (the difference between the cost of production and the coin's value), expected to make up to $40 million a year on the coins. From the proceeds, a total of $60 million over five years was dedicated toward funding the 1988 Winter Olympics in Calgary.

The failure of the Susan B. Anthony dollar coin in the United States had been considered and it was believed Americans refused to support the coin due to its similarity to their quarter coin and its lack of aesthetic appeal. In announcing the new Canadian dollar coin, the government stated it would be the same overall size as the Susan B. Anthony coin – slightly larger than a quarter – to allow for compatibility with American manufactured vending machines, but would be eleven-sided and gold-coloured.

It was planned that the coin would continue using the voyageur theme of its predecessor, but the master dies that had been struck in Ottawa were lost in transit en route to the Mint's facility at Winnipeg. A Commons committee struck to investigate the loss discovered that the Mint had no documented procedures for transport of master dies and that it had shipped them via a local courier in a bid to save $43.50. It was also found to be the third time that the Mint had lost master dies within five years. An internal review by the Royal Canadian Mint argued that while a policy existed to ship the obverse and reverse dies separately, the new coin dies were packaged separately but were part of the same shipment. The Mint also disagreed with the Royal Canadian Mounted Police's contention that the dies were simply lost in transit, believing instead that they were stolen. The dies were never recovered.

Fearing the possibility of counterfeiting, the government approved a new design for the reverse, replacing the voyageur with a Robert-Ralph Carmichael design of a common loon floating in water. The coin was immediately nicknamed the "loonie" across English Canada, and became known as a "huard", French for "loon", in Quebec. The loonie entered circulation on June 30, 1987, as 40 million coins were introduced into major cities across the country. Over 800 million loonies had been struck by the coin's 20th anniversary.

After a 21-month period in which the loonie and $1 note were produced concurrently with each other, the Bank of Canada ceased production of the dollar banknote. The final dollar bills were printed on June 30, 1989. Initial support for the coin was mixed, but withdrawing the banknote forced acceptance of the coin.

The loonie has subsequently gained iconic status within Canada, and is now regarded as a national symbol. The term "loonie" has since become synonymous with the Canadian dollar itself. The town of Echo Bay, Ontario, home of Robert-Ralph Carmichael, erected a large loonie monument in his honour in 1992 along the highway, similar to Sudbury's 'Big Nickel'.

Lucky loonie

Officials for the 2002 Salt Lake Winter Olympics invited the National Hockey League's ice making consultant, Dan Craig, to oversee the city's E Center arena, where the ice hockey tournament was being held. Craig invited a couple of members from the ice crew in his hometown of Edmonton to assist. One of them, Trent Evans, secretly placed a loonie at centre ice. He originally placed a dime, but added the loonie after the smaller coin quickly vanished as the ice surface was built up. He placed the coins after realizing there was no target at centre ice for referees to aim for when dropping the puck for a faceoff. A thin yellow dot was painted on the ice surface over the coins, though the loonie was faintly visible to those who knew to look for it.

Keeping the coin a secret, Evans told only a few people of its placement and swore them to secrecy. Among those told were the players of the men's and women's teams. Both Canadian teams went on to win gold medals. Several members of the women's team kissed the spot where the coin was buried following their victory. After the men won their final, the coin was dug up and given to Wayne Gretzky, the team's executive-director, who revealed the existence of the "lucky loonie" at a post-game press conference.

The lucky loonie quickly became a piece of Canadian lore. The original lucky loonie was donated to the Hockey Hall of Fame, and Canadians have subsequently hidden loonies at several international competitions, including the 2008 Olympic Games and the 2010 IIHF World Championships. Loonies were buried in the foundations of facilities built for the 2010 Winter Olympics in Vancouver.

Capitalizing on the tradition, the Royal Canadian Mint has released a commemorative edition "lucky loonie" for each Olympic Games since 2004.

Composition
The weight of the coin was originally specified as 108 grains, equivalent to 6.998 grams. The coin's diameter is 26.5mm.

When introduced, loonie coins were made of aureate, a bronze–electroplated nickel combination. Beginning in 2007, some loonie blanks also began to be produced with a cyanide-free brass plating process. In the second quarter of 2012, the composition switched to multi-ply brass-plated steel. As a result, the weight dropped from 7.00 to 6.27 grams. This resulted in the 2012 loonie not being accepted in some vending machines. The Toronto Parking Authority estimated that at about $345 per machine, it would cost about $1 million to upgrade almost 3,000 machines to accept the new coins. The Mint stated that multi-ply plated steel technology, already used in Canada's smaller coinage, produces an electromagnetic signature that is harder to counterfeit than that of regular alloy coins; also, using steel provides cost savings and avoids fluctuations in price or supply of nickel.

On April 10, 2012, the Royal Canadian Mint announced design changes to the loonie and toonie, which include new security features.

Commemorative editions
Alongside the regular minting of the loonie with the standard image of the common loon on the coin's reverse, the Royal Canadian Mint has also released commemorative editions of the one-dollar coin for a variety of occasions.  These coins have a circulation-grade finish and have been made available to the public in five-coin packs and in 25-coin rolls in addition to being released directly into circulation.

Terry Fox loonie 

The Terry Fox Loonie was unveiled in 2005 and designed by Senior Engraver Stanley Witten. The coin depicts the Canadian athlete, humanitarian, and cancer research activist Terry Fox.

Following his design of the 2005 Terry Fox loonie, Witten told the Ottawa Citizen that "while sculpting the design, I wanted to capture Terry fighting the elements, running against the wind, towering over wind-bent trees on a lonely stretch of Canadian wilderness."

Specimen set editions
In 1997, 2002, and each year since 2004, the Royal Canadian Mint has issued a one-dollar coin that depicts a different and unique image of a bird on the coin's reverse.  These special loonies have limited mintages and are available only in the six-coin specimen sets.

First strikes

References

Footnotes

Bibliography

External links
 Loonie value – 1935 to today
 The chemistry of the loonie

1987 establishments in Canada
Coins of Canada
Canadian one-dollar coin
Canadian one-dollar coin
Canadian one-dollar coin